Christopher Cooper Ewbank (10 March 1845 – 9 July 1933) was an English cricketer. Ewbank was a right-handed batsman who fielded occasionally as a wicket-keeper. He was born at Cambridge, Cambridgeshire.

Ewbank made his first-class debut for the Marylebone Cricket Club against Sussex at the Royal Brunswick Ground, Brighton. In the Marylebone Cricket Club's first-innings, he was dismissed for a single run by James Lillywhite, while in their second-innings he was dismissed for 31 runs by Richard Fillery. The following season, he made two first-class appearances for Sussex, against the Marylebone Cricket Club at the Royal Brunswick Ground, and Surrey at The Oval. Twelve years later in 1879, he made a final first-class appearance for Sussex against the Marylebone Cricket Club at Lord's. In three first-class matches for the county, he scored 63 runs at an average of 10.50, with a high score of 23.

He was the vicar of Langford, Bedfordshire, for 63 years from 1870 and died there on 9 July 1933. His brother, George, also played first-class cricket.

References

External links
Christopher Ewbank at ESPNcricinfo
Christopher Ewbank at CricketArchive

1845 births
1933 deaths
Cricketers from Cambridgeshire
Sportspeople from Cambridge
English cricketers
Marylebone Cricket Club cricketers
Sussex cricketers